The Kanker rock gecko (Hemidactylus yajurvedi) is a species of gecko. It is endemic to Chhattisgarh, India.

References

Hemidactylus
Reptiles described in 2015
Endemic fauna of India
Reptiles of India